The Catoca diamond mine is the fourth largest diamond mine in the world, and is located in Angola. The mine is owned by a consortium of international mining interests, including Endiama (the state mining company of Angola) (32.8% ownership), Alrosa of Russia (32.8%), Odebrecht of Brazil (16.4%), and the Diamond Finance CY BV Group (16.8%). The mine is located on a kimberlite pipe.

Production
The mine's production is 35% gem quality, compared to a global average of 20%; the diamonds produced at Catoca have an average value of US$75–$100 per carat ($375–500/g). Estimated reserves are 60 million carats (12 tonnes).

The diamonds from Catoca Mining Society topped the sales of 2009, with a net profit of US$70 million, resulting from a gross production of US$122.6 million, Angop. The information is contained in an annual report from the company released in September 2011. According to the source, the sales reached , at the average rate of US$62.23, a volume that represented about 78 percent of the amount sold by the diamond companies around the country. The note states that as a result of the processing of the ore, the company obtained a total of 7.5 million carats that permitted it to establish the operational cost.

In 2012 the mine extracted  out of 10 million tonnes of ore production.

2021 tailings leak
In July 2021, waste material from the mine leaked into the nearby Tshikapa river. The Democratic Republic of the Congo stated the contaminated water killed 12 people, and sickened more than 4,000. The spill turned the river red and killed large numbers of fish, but Catoca claimed the spill did not contain heavy metals. Independent testing found the presence of nickel and uranium contamination. Satellite imaging collected by the European Space Agency's Sentinel-2 was able to infer the extent of the impact on water quality by observing the change in the river's color. The government of the DRC initially said it would pursue unspecified monetary damages for the incident, but as of October 2022, no talks had taken place.

Geology
The Catoca diamond deposit occurs in a kimberlite pipe.

References

MBendi
 Catoca Diamond Mine (Катока) в энциклопедии "Карьеры мира"

Diamond mines in Angola
Surface mines in Angola
Diatremes
Volcanoes of Angola
Pre-Holocene volcanoes
Tailings dam failures
Dam failures in Africa
2021 disasters in Angola
Man-made disasters in Angola